Dawn Park is a suburb of Boksburg close to Vosloorus.

References

Populated places in Ekurhuleni